The men's high jump at the 2015 IPC Athletics World Championships was held at the Suheim Bin Hamad Stadium in Doha from 22–31 October.

Medalists

See also
List of IPC world records in athletics

References

high jump
High jump at the World Para Athletics Championships